Xie Jin (1355–1430) was a Chinese landscape painter and calligrapher during the Ming Dynasty (1368–1644).

Xie was also known by other names: 'Kongzhao' (孔昭), 'Kuiyin' (葵印), 'Dieshan Xie' (謝疊山), and 'Tingsheng Lan' (蘭庭生).  Some of his works can be found at the Shanghai Museum.

His The Dingshu Fishing Boat is the earliest extant Chinese folding fan painting.

References

1355 births
1430 deaths
Ming dynasty landscape painters
Ming dynasty calligraphers
15th-century Chinese calligraphers
14th-century Chinese calligraphers